Italy competed at the 2019 World Athletics Championships in Doha, Qatar, from 27 September to 6 October 2019 .

Medalists

Placing table
Italy team finished 26th position in placing table.

Team
On 12 September 2019, the technical commissioner of the Italian national team Antonio La Torre issued the list of the athletes called up for the Doha World Championships, 65 athletes (34 men and 31 women), including members of all five relays (the only country to have managed to qualify them all in addition to Jamaica), and 7 athletes selected based on the target numbers established by the IAAF. With a total of 66 final entries (one woman athlete is added on 21 September), this is the biggest Italian team ever at the World Championships (same number as in 1997, 66).

Men (33)
Initially 34, the selected were reduced to 33 because Giorgio Rubino (G.A. Fiamme Gialle), selected for Race walk 20 km has given forfait.

Italic: did not participate

Women (32)

Notes

References

External links
Doha World Championships 2019

Nations at the 2019 World Athletics Championships
World Championships in Athletics
Italy at the World Championships in Athletics